Leucocephala, a Latin word meaning white-headed, may refer to:
 8971 Leucocephala, a Main-belt asteroid discovered on September 29, 1973

Species Latin names

 W. leucocephala
 Wigandia leucocephala, a flowering plant species in the genus Wigandia

Subspecies
Lomandra leucocephala subsp. leucocephala, a subspecies in the species Lomandra leucocephala, a plant in the genus Lomandra found in New South Wales, Australia

See also
 Leucocephalum
 Leucocephalus